Irani is a municipality situated in the state of Santa Catarina, Brazil, with an estimated population in 2020 of 10,498 inhabitants. It is located in 27º01'29" S and 51º54'06" W and 1,047 m above sea level.

References

Municipalities in Santa Catarina (state)